Prince of Guangling may refer to:

Princes of the Guangling Commandery during the Han period
Sima Yu (278–300), Jin dynasty prince
Emperor Xianzong of Tang (778–820), known as Prince of Guangling before he took the throne